Master of Sports of Russia  (MS) is a sports honorary title in the Russian Federation.

To assign the title of MS prerequisite is to participate in the competition judged at least 3 judges of the All-Russia and international category and receive necessary amount of scores or take a certain place among other athletes. The Ministry of Sports of Russia assigns titles to outstanding athletes by a special award order.

See also
 Unified Sports Classification System of the USSR and Russia

References

External links
 Положение о Единой всероссийской спортивной классификации Федерального агентства по физической культуре и спорту

Sports trophies and awards
Sports
Sports titles of Russia